Zoopark Chomutov is a Czech zoo located on the outskirts of Chomutov in Ústí nad Labem Region, Czech Republic.

The zoo holds more than a 1000 individuals of about 160 species, among them 14 species listed as endangered in European rescue programs. Zoopark Chomutov is also connected to the National Grid stations for handicapped animals that provide care for injured wildlife. Those animals are released into the wild after treatment and after-care.

External links

References

Zoos in the Czech Republic
Buildings and structures in Chomutov
Zoos established in 1975
1975 establishments in Czechoslovakia
20th-century architecture in the Czech Republic